Flávio Chamis is a Brazilian composer and conductor. His CD "Especiaria" was released in Brazil by the Biscoito Fino label. The CD was nominated for a 2007 Latin Grammy Awards, and one of its songs "Deuses do Céu" was a finalist in Session 1 of the 2007 John Lennon Songwriting Contest. <ref>https://jlsc.com/winners/2007a/finalists.php<ref> Chamis also received the "2007 International Press Award" in Fort Lauderdale, Florida.
On the classical front, Chamis studied at the Rubin Academy of Music, at the Tel Aviv University, graduating in Orchestral Conducting at the Hochschule für Musik Detmold. Chamis served as an assistant conductor to Leonard Bernstein on several occasions, and recorded for the Solstice Label with the Nouvel Orchestre Philharmonique de Radio France. 
Flávio Chamis presently lives in Pittsburgh, Pennsylvania.

References

External links
 Especiaria at Biscoito Fino official website

Música Popular Brasileira musicians
Brazilian songwriters
Brazilian conductors (music)
Tel Aviv University alumni
Year of birth missing (living people)
Living people
Hochschule für Musik Detmold alumni
21st-century conductors (music)